San Phra Kan is a Hindu/Buddhist shrine in the town of Lop Buri in Thailand. The original structure dates to the time of the Khmer Empire, though it has received later additions. It is a popular tourist attraction best known for the monkeys inhabiting the area.

References

Tourist attractions in Lopburi province